Dangpa, or dang pa, is the Korean name for a Ranseur (three-pronged trident-like spear) first described in the Muyejebo, a Korean martial arts manual of the Joseon Dynasty (published 1610).

Types
There were several types of dangpa, such as the iron  and the wooden . The two outer teeth of the  would be slightly crooked.

The middle tip would always be slightly longer than the two other tips. This design was intended to lessen the chance of the weapon becoming stuck in an opponent's body.

At the other end of the pole would be a sharp tip as well, in case two-handed combat with the dangpa became necessary in battle - this way soldiers fighting with the dangpa had fighting edges on both ends of the weapon.

Usage
The dangpa is a defensive close combat weapon used to trap an enemy's sword between two of the three prongs.

Techniques
In the Muyedobotongji one set of techniques is given. This form of 22 movements is called  accompanied by a diagram to explain the same form called .

Traditional Korean weapons
Polearms
Spears
Tridents